Kharanitar is a village development committee in Nuwakot District in the Bagmati Zone of central Nepal. At the time of the 1991 Nepal census it had a population of 1524 living in 298 individual households.

Kharanitar is a beautiful small village with small number of population comparing to other Village Development Committee. There are different group of caste like Shrestha, Uprety, Pathak, Tamang, Kandel, Khanal, Tiwari, Sitaula, Nepali, Bishokarma, Bania, Chaulagian, Sudedi, Silwal.etc.after earthquake this village is under construction...

References

External links
UN map of the municipalities of Nuwakot District

Populated places in Nuwakot District